Doris chrysoderma is a species of sea slug, a dorid nudibranch, a shell-less marine gastropod mollusk in the family Dorididae.

Distribution
This species has been found in temperate waters in Southern Australia ranging from New South Wales to Western Australia.

The type locality is Port Jackson.

Description
This sublittoral species has a background colour ranging from bright yellow to a fairly pale cream. D. chrysoderma always has rounded white pustules. This species grows to approximately 30 mm in length.

References

Further reading
 Gary R. McDonald, University of California Santa Cruz (29 luglio 2006). Nudibranch Systematic Index, University of California Santa Cruz. Institute of Marine Sciences.
 Burn R. (2006) A checklist and bibliography of the Opisthobranchia (Mollusca: Gastropoda) of Victoria and the Bass Strait area, south-eastern Australia. Museum Victoria Science Reports 10:1–42

External links

 Sea slug forum

Dorididae
Gastropods described in 1864